Garry John Cowmeadow (born 21 August 1954) is a former cricketer who played for Tasmania from 1976 to 1979.

Cowmeadow was born at Huonville, Tasmania and was a useful medium-fast bowler with a good economy rate, who proved well suited to the one-day game. He was a member of the Tasmanian team which played in the state's first ever Sheffield Shield match in 1977, and in the 1978–79 Gillette Cup winning side.

He also played three games of Australian rules football in the Victorian Football League for South Melbourne in 1975.

References

External links 

1954 births
Australian cricketers
Living people
Sydney Swans players
Tasmania cricketers
Cricketers from Tasmania
Australian rules footballers from Tasmania
Penguin Football Club players